William Henry Gale (fl. 1860s–1890s) was an associate justice of the Colorado Territorial Supreme Court from June 10, 1865, to July 19, 1866.

Early life and political efforts
Little is written about Gale, and sources differ on his origin. One source says he was from Illinois, but another says he was from New York. A contemporaneous account describes him as being "of New York", but does not indicate whether that was his place of birth or merely his domicile at the time.

It appears that Gale was examined and found to possess the qualifications required for admission to the bar in New York in September 1849. He became involved in Republican politics in New York, albeit with little success. In 1855 he was a candidate for County Judge, and in 1858, a candidate for Alderman. He was again a candidate for County Judge in 1859, and in 1862, and in January 1865 was appointed a Commissioner of Deeds.

Judicial service
In June 1865, Gale and Charles F. Holly were jointly appointed to the Colorado Territorial Supreme Court by President Andrew Johnson, and subsequently confirmed by the United States Senate.
Gale was preceded as associate justice by Charles Lee Armour and succeeded by Christian S. Eyster. He resigned because he found his salary inadequate.

Later life
By 1890, it was reported that "ex-Judge William H. Gale" had headed an unsuccessful opposition ticket in the Republican primary election for leadership of Brooklyn's Twenty-fifth Ward. In July 1891, Gale was "busily engaged... as a referee under appointment from Judge Pratt" taking testimony in the child custody case of a wealthy New York family. In August of that year, it was reported that Gale's wife Mary had died.

References

People from New York (state)
Justices of the Colorado Supreme Court
Colorado Territory officials
Year of birth missing
Year of death missing